The Darwin Correctional Centre, an Australian minimum to maximum security prison for males and females, is approximately  by road from Darwin, Northern Territory, Australia. The centre is managed by Northern Territory Department of Correctional Services, of the Government of the Northern Territory. The centre detains sentenced and charged felons under Northern Territory and/or Commonwealth law.

Facilities
The centre is a multi-classification prison with a capacity of 1048 prisoners of all security ratings. The centre was completed in 2014 and is the main reception prison in the Northern Territory, servicing most of the northern and metropolitan regions.

Notable prisoners
Bradley John MurdochConvicted and sentenced to life imprisonment with 28 years before he may be considered for parole for the abduction and murder of British backpacker Peter Falconio and attempted murder of Joanne Lees.
Aaron Summers Former Australian Cricketer, convicted on child sex crimes

See also
Doug Owston Correctional Centre (Darwin Correctional Centre from November 2014)
Berrimah Prison (closed November 2014)

References

External links
Northern Territory Correctional Services website
NT Prisons and probation website
Darwin Correctional Centre website

Prisons in the Northern Territory
Buildings and structures in Darwin, Northern Territory
2014 establishments in Australia